Elliott Lloyd Nevitt (born 30 October 1996) is an English professional footballer who plays for Crewe Alexandra as a striker.

Career

Non-league and Sunday league
Nevitt spent five years in non-league football, before which he attended college. He played non-league football for Everton Xaverians, Burscough, City of Liverpool (two spells), AFC Liverpool, Bootle and Waterloo Dock. He joined Warrington Rylands 1906 in October 2020 from City of Liverpool, and scored a hat-trick for the club in the 2021 FA Vase Final at Wembley Stadium.

In addition to playing semi-professional non-league football, he regularly played Sunday league football and has twice appeared in the final of the country's premier cup competition, the FA Sunday Cup for Campfield FC, a Liverpool club. In the 2014–15 final played at Ewood Park, he appeared as a second-half substitute as the club beat OJM. He also appeared in the final of the 2019–20 competition, delayed due to the COVID-19 pandemic, where he scored the winning goal at St James' Park in extra time as the club beat Luton-based St Joseph's.

Tranmere Rovers
He turned professional by signing a one-year contract with League Two club Tranmere Rovers in July 2021.

He made his professional debut on 10 August, scoring the second goal in a 2–2 draw with Oldham Athletic in the first round of the EFL Cup. In November, he signed a contract extension with Tranmere until 2023.

Crewe Alexandra
He signed for Crewe Alexandra on 11 January 2023.

Career statistics

Honours
Warrington Rylands 1906
FA Vase: 2020–21

Individual
EFL League Two – Goal of the Month: January 2022
Tranmere Rovers Player of the Season: 2021–22

References

1996 births
Living people
English footballers
City of Liverpool F.C. players
Burscough F.C. players
Waterloo Dock A.F.C. players
A.F.C. Liverpool players
Bootle F.C. players
Warrington Rylands 1906 F.C. players
Tranmere Rovers F.C. players
Crewe Alexandra F.C. players
Association football forwards
English Football League players
North West Counties Football League players